Léhon (Gallo: Léon) was a former commune in the Côtes-d'Armor department of Brittany in northwestern France. On 1 January 2018, it was merged into the commune of Dinan.

Population
Inhabitants of Léhon were called léhonnais in French.

Personalities
Almamy Schuman Bah, footballer

See also
Communes of the Côtes-d'Armor department

References

External links

Official website 

Former communes of Côtes-d'Armor